Garrett Cochran (August 26, 1876 – July 8, 1918) was an American football player and coach.  He played college football at Princeton University from 1894 to 1897 at the end position, and was twice named to the College Football All-America Team.   Cochran served as the head football coach at the University of California, Berkeley (1898–1899), the United States Naval Academy (1900) and Princeton University (1902), compiling a career head coaching record of 29–5–3.

During World War I, Cochran enlisted in the United States Army and served in France as a lieutenant in the field artillery.  He developed pneumonia and died on a ship returning to the United States on July 8, 1918.

In 1971, Cochran was posthumously inducted into the College Football Hall of Fame.

Head coaching record

References

External links
 
 

1876 births
1918 deaths
19th-century players of American football
American football ends
California Golden Bears football coaches
College Football Hall of Fame inductees
Navy Midshipmen football coaches
Princeton Tigers baseball players
Princeton Tigers football coaches
Princeton Tigers football players
All-American college football players
United States Army personnel of World War I
United States Army officers
People from Driftwood, Pennsylvania
Coaches of American football from Pennsylvania
Players of American football from Pennsylvania
American military personnel killed in World War I
People who died at sea
Military personnel from Pennsylvania